Philippe-Maurice Albert Victor Amédée César, 9th duc de Broglie (born 28 September 1960) is a French aristocrat and duke.

The duke was born in Paris as the second son of Prince Jean de Broglie (1921–1976) and Micheline Segard (1925–1997). He inherited the dukedom after the death of his older brother Victor-François in 2012.

The duke's heir presumptive is his younger brother, Louis-Albert de Broglie (born 15 March 1963), prince of Broglie.

References

Living people
1960 births
Philippe-Maurice, duc de Broglie